Rimma (Russian: Римма) is a Russian feminine given name that may refer to the following notable people: 
Rimma Aldonina (born 1928), Russian architect and children's poet
Rimma Belova (born May 1933), Soviet long track speed skater
Rimma Bilunova (1940–2015), Russian chess player 
Rimma Brailovskaya (1877–1959), Russian painter
Rimma Ivanova (1894–1915), Russian nurse
Rimma Kazakova (1932–2008), Russian poet
Rimma Luchshenko (born 29 April 1993) was a road cyclist from Kazakhstan
Rimma Markova (1925–2015), Russian film actress
Rimma Komina (1926–1995), Russian literary critic
Rimma Koshelyova (born 1936), Soviet hurdler
Rimma Kuruch (1938–2019), Russian language educator
Rimma Wilms, German figure skater
Rimma Zherder (1940–2021), Russian stage actress
Rimma Zhukova (1925–1999), Russian speed skater

See also
Rima (given name)

Russian feminine given names